Kolomensky District is an administrative and municipal district (raion), one of the thirty-six in Moscow Oblast, Russia. It is located in the southeast of the oblast and borders with Lukhovitsky, Ozyorsky, Stupinsky, Voskresensky, and with Yegoryevsky Districts and the territory of the City of Kolomna. Its administrative center is the city of Kolomna (which is not administratively a part of the district). Population:  40,780 (2002 Census);

Geography
Main rivers flowing through the district are the Oka and the Moskva. They are relatively clean.

History
The district was established in 1929.

Administrative and municipal status
Within the framework of administrative divisions, Kolomensky District is one of the thirty-six in the oblast. The city of Kolomna serves as its administrative center, despite being incorporated separately as a city under oblast jurisdiction—an administrative unit with the status equal to that of the districts.

As a municipal division, the district is incorporated as Kolomensky Municipal District. Kolomna City Under Oblast Jurisdiction is incorporated separately from the district as Kolomna Urban Okrug.

References

Notes

Sources

Districts of Moscow Oblast